01:59PM is the first studio album by South Korean boy band, 2PM. The album was released in digital and physical format by November 10, 2009. This would be the only 2PM album in which Jay Park would sing, although his face was excluded from the cover following his departure from the band.

Teasers
On October 30, 2009, a clock appeared on 2PM's official website, counting down from 70:40. While netizens predicted that it would reach zero at 4:30PM on November 2, the clock instead froze when it reached 1:59; at that time, the teaser for "기다리다 지친다" ("Tired of Waiting"), was released, drawing much interest from netizens. Another countdown began for the full song, which was released with the album cover on November 3 at 12:00 AM, when the clock again stopped at 1:59. The next teaser for the second track "너에게 미쳤었다" ("I Was Crazy About You") appeared on November 5 with the same procedure, and the full song the next day. The 6 members then each released teaser clips on YouTube.

Track listing

Chart performance
Upon release, both the album and title track, "Heartbeat", quickly rose to the number one position on multiple music sales charts.

Release history

References

External links
 Official Website

2009 debut albums
2PM albums
JYP Entertainment albums
Kakao M albums
Korean-language albums